Rodney Griffin (born 5 January 1987) is a Papua New Guinean professional rugby league footballer who plays as a  and  forward for the Northern Pride in the Queensland Cup. He is a  Papua New Guinean international.

Background
Born in Papua New Guinea, Griffin moved to Australia at the age of 3 and played his junior rugby league for the Atherton Roosters, before going into the North Queensland Cowboys' academy system.

Playing career

Early career
In 2005, Griffin played for the Wynnum Manly Seagulls in the Queensland Cup. In 2006, he moved down to Sydney, New South Wales to play in the Wests Tigers' junior grades.

2007
In October and November, Griffin played 3 games for Papua New Guinea against Wales, and France twice.

2008
In 2008, Griffin returned to the Queensland Cup to play for the Northern Pride RLFC. In October and November, he played 3 games for Papua New Guinea at the 2008 Rugby League World Cup against England, New Zealand and Australia.

2009
In 2009, Griffin had hopes of gaining a contract with the North Queensland Cowboys.

2010
On 19 September, Griffin played in the Pride's 2010 Queensland Cup Grand Final victory over the Norths Devils. In October and November, he played 3 games for Papua New Guinea at the 2010 Rugby League Four Nations against Australia, New Zealand and England.

2011
In 2011, Griffin joined the Tweed Heads Seagulls. On 25 September, he played in the Seagulls' 2011 Queensland Cup Grand Final defeat by the Wynnum Manly Seagulls. This was his third Queensland Cup grand final in a row, after losing with the Pride in 2009 and winning with the Pride in 2010.

2013
After spotting him in the Papua New Guinea camp while assistant coaching the side in 2010, Ipswich Jets co-coaches Ben and Shane Walker signed Griffin to the Ipswich side, after initially missing out on him in 2010. The Walkers stripped 10 kilograms from his frame and moulded him into an 80-minute middle forward capable of performances like 309 metres in 66 minutes in Queensland Cup.

2015
In 2015, Griffin did a pre-season with the Brisbane Broncos, but failed to gain a contract. On 27 September, he played in the Jets' 2015 Queensland Cup Grand Final victory over the Townsville Blackhawks. On 4 October, he played in the Jets' 2015 NRL State Championship victory over the Newcastle Knights, scoring a try and setting up a try for winger Marmin Barba. On 13 October, he signed a 1-year contract to return to the Wests Tigers starting in 2016.

2016
On 7 May, Griffin played for Papua New Guinea against Fiji in the 2016 Melanesian Cup. Despite not being able to break into the Tigers' NRL team for 2016, he re-signed with them for 2017.

2017
On 8 February, Griffin was granted a release for his Tigers' contract to join the Canterbury-Bankstown Bulldogs, spending the entire season in the New South Wales Cup. At the end of the season, he represented Papua New Guinea at the 2017 Rugby League World Cup and was named in the NSW Cup Team of the Year.

2018
After two seasons in Sydney without making his NRL debut, Griffin returned to north Queensland, joining the Townsville Blackhawks in the Queensland Cup.

References

External links
Canterbury Bulldogs profile
Ipswich Jets profile
2017 RLWC profile

1987 births
Living people
Ipswich Jets players
Northern Pride RLFC players
Papua New Guinea national rugby league team captains
Papua New Guinea national rugby league team players
Papua New Guinean emigrants to Australia
Papua New Guinean rugby league players
Rugby league locks
Rugby league props
Rugby league second-rows
Tweed Heads Seagulls players
Wests Tigers NSW Cup players
Wynnum Manly Seagulls players